The Journal of Studies on Alcohol and Drugs (JSAD) is a peer-reviewed scientific journal that publishes original research articles on various aspects of the use and misuse of alcohol and other drugs. Topics covered include the biological, medical, epidemiological, social, psychological, and legal aspects of alcohol and other drug use, abuse, and dependence. The journal was established in 1940 as the Quarterly Journal of Studies on Alcohol, changed its name in 1975 to Journal of Studies on Alcohol, before obtaining its current name in 2007. The journal appears bimonthly and publishes supplements at irregular intervals. The Journal of Studies on Alcohol and Drugs is a not-for-profit journal based in the Center of Alcohol Studies at Rutgers University.

Impact factor 
According to the Journal Citation Reports, the journal's 2017 impact factor is 2.616, ranking it 10th of 35 journals in the category "Substance Abuse" (social science), 9th of 19 journals in the category "Substance Abuse" (science), and 36th of 95 journals in the category "Psychology" (science).

Editors-in-chief 
The editor-in-chief of the journal as of 1 July 2015 is Thomas F. Babor (University of Connecticut). Previous editors-in-chief have been Howard W. Haggard (1940–1958), Mark Keller (1958–1977), Timothy Coffee (1977–1984), Jack H. Mendelson and Nancy K. Mello (1984–1991), John Carpenter (1991–1994), and Marc A. Schuckit (University of California, San Diego) (1994-2015).

References

External links 
 

Bimonthly journals
Publications established in 1940
English-language journals
Addiction medicine journals